San Marcos (Spanish for "St. Mark") is a city in the North County region of San Diego County, California. As of the 2020 census, the city's population was 94,833. It is the site of California State University San Marcos. The city is bordered by Escondido to the east, Encinitas to the southwest, Carlsbad to the west, and Vista to the northwest. Lake San Marcos is an enclave, or county island, in the southwestern part of the city, within San Marcos' sphere of influence but technically an unincorporated community.

History

According to historical legends, the San Luis Rey Mission flocks were robbed by a small band of Native Americans in the late 18th century. Fleeing the Spanish troops, the Native Americans escaped to the hills. While pursuing the Native Americans, in 1797 the Spaniards came upon a fertile valley, which was named Los Vallecitos de San Marcos (Little Valleys of Saint Mark) to honor the day of discovery: April 25, St. Mark’s Day. On April 22, 1840, Governor Juan B. Alvarado granted Rancho Vallecitos de San Marcos to his relative, Jose María Alvarado. Jose Alvarado was killed at the Pauma Massacre in 1846, and the land was left to his wife; she then sold the land to Lorenzo Soto. In the late 1850s, Soto sold part of his land to Cave Couts, and his family was soon raising livestock. Although Cave Couts owned the land, Major Gustavus French Merriam from Topeka, Kansas, made the first permanent settlement. Merriam homesteaded  in the north Twin Oaks Valley and began wine and honey production.

German and Dutch immigrants began moving into the area in the early 1880s. In 1883, a few miles south of the settlement, John H. Barham (for whom the present-day Barham Drive is named) founded the first town in the area, originally situated on the southeast corner of what are now Rancho Santa Fe Road and San Marcos Boulevard. By 1884, the town of Barham had a post office, blacksmith, feed store and weekly newspaper. In 1887, the San Marcos Land Company bought almost all of the San Marcos land formerly owned by the Couts family and promptly divided the land into tracts. Soon the hills began attracting home-seekers.

The original town of San Marcos was about a mile north of Barham, at the intersection of what is now Grand Avenue and Rancho Santa Fe Road. In 1887, the Santa Fe Railroad announced that it was going to lay tracks going through the valley, but to the disappointment of the citizens, the tracks were laid one mile (1.6 km) from the center of the town. By 1896, San Marcos was a community with its own stores, post office, blacksmith, and railroad depot. The first school in the area, which was started in Barham in 1886, had been moved to San Marcos three years later, as Barham was fading due to its distance from the railroad. To prevent San Marcos from suffering a similar fate, in 1903 the people of the town picked up their homes and moved a couple miles east along the railroad tracks to what now are Mission Road and Pico Avenue. By 1905, the town had every convenience, including rural mail delivery and telephone service. Later that same year, the Richland School (now a wedding chapel on Woodland Avenue) was built, becoming the second school in San Marcos. The main business in San Marcos in the 19th and early 20th centuries was farming. In the mid-20th century, dairies and poultry production became a big part of the business in the town.

San Marcos experienced a period of growth from 1956 onward, when the first water from the Colorado River arrived. Several small businesses were founded and the population rapidly increased to 2,500. San Marcos became an incorporated city on January 28, 1963. In the 1970s, San Marcos was flourishing as the third fastest-growing city in the state, and had a population of 17,479 by 1980. The population continued to boom during succeeding decades, surpassing 30,000 in 1990 and nearing 100,000 by 2020.

Geography

Due to the moderating influence of the nearby Pacific, temperatures rarely fall below freezing in winter and above 100 degrees F. in summer. Like most of coastal San Diego County, cool overcast from the Pacific is common in May and June ("May gray", "June gloom"). July through September are usually the warmest months, although hot and dry Santa Ana winds can strike any month (most commonly August) and raise risks of severe wildfires. Most of the rain falls between November and March, averaging about 13 inches per year, with up to 20 inches falling in the San Marcos Hills.

Neighborhoods

Buenavida
Coronado Hills
Creek District
Discovery Hills
Discovery Meadows
Grandon Estates
Lake San Marcos (unincorporated)
Old Creek Ranch
Rancho Coronado/Rancho Tesoro
Rancho Dorado
Rancho Santalina
Rancho Tesoro
Richland
Richmar
Rock Springs/Bennett District
Sage Canyon
San Elijo Hills
Santa Fe Hills
Stone Canyon
Twin Oaks Valley
Village O
University District/North City

Demographics

2010
The 2010 United States Census reported that San Marcos had a population of 83,781. The racial makeup of San Marcos was 53,235 (63.5%) White, 1,967 (2.3%) African American, 591 (0.7%) Native American, 7,518 (9.0%) Asian, 322 (0.4%) Pacific Islander, 15,853 (18.9%) from other races, and 4,295 (5.1%) from two or more races. Hispanic or Latino of any race were 30,697 persons (36.6%).

The Census reported that 82,937 people (99.0% of the population) lived in households, 736 (0.9%) lived in non-institutionalized group quarters, and 108 (0.1%) were institutionalized.

There were 27,202 households, out of which 11,724 (43.1%) had children under the age of 18 living in them, 15,242 (56.0%) were opposite-sex married couples living together, 3,056 (11.2%) had a female householder with no husband present, 1,513 (5.6%) had a male householder with no wife present.  There were 1,372 (5.0%) unmarried opposite-sex partnerships, and 186 (0.7%) same-sex married couples or partnerships; 5,168 households (19.0%) were made up of individuals, and 2,370 (8.7%) had someone living alone who was 65 years of age or older. The average household size was 3.05.  There were 19,811 families (72.8% of all households); the average family size was 3.49.

The population was spread out, with 23,287 people (27.8%) under the age of 18, 9,215 people (11.0%) aged 18 to 24, 25,237 people (30.1%) aged 25 to 44, 17,515 people (20.9%) aged 45 to 64, and 8,527 people (10.2%) who were 65 years of age or older. The median age was 32.9 years. For every 100 females, there were 95.6 males. For every 100 females age 18 and over, there were 92.6 males.

The homeowner vacancy rate was 2.1%; the rental vacancy rate was 5.7%. 50,570 people (60.4% of the population) lived in owner-occupied housing units and 32,367 people (38.6%) lived in rental housing units.

2000
As of the census of 2000, there were 54,977 people, 18,111 households, and 13,221 families residing in the city. The population density was 893.4/km2 (2,314.3/mi2). There were 18,862 housing units at an average density of 306.5/km2 (794.0/mi2). The racial makeup of the city was 67.39% White, 2.00% African American, 0.82% Native American, 4.67% Asian, 0.24% Pacific Islander, 20.39% from other races, and 4.48% from two or more races.  36.87% of the population were Hispanic or Latino of any race.

There were 18,111 households, out of which 39.1% had children under the age of 18 living with them, 58.6% were married couples living together, 9.6% had a female householder with no husband present, and 27.0% were non-families. Of all households, 20.3% were made up of individuals, and 10.6% had someone living alone who was 65 years of age or older. The average household size was 3.03 and the average family size was 3.46.

In the city, the population was spread out, with 29.1% under the age of 18, 9.4% from 18 to 24, 32.3% from 25 to 44, 17.3% from 45 to 64, and 11.9% who were 65 years of age or older. The median age was 32 years. For every 100 females, there were 98.4 males. For every 100 females age 18 and over, there were 95.3 males.

The median income for a household in the city was $45,908, and the median income for a family was $51,292. Males had a median income of $36,297 versus $27,015 for females. The per capita income for the city was $18,657. 12.0% of the population and 7.8% of families were below the poverty line. Out of the total population, 14.5% of those under the age of 18 and 7.9% of those 65 and older were living below the poverty line.

Ethnic/cultural diversity 
San Marcos has a diversity of races and ethnic groups common in suburban communities (not ranked, but for example): African Americans, Irish, Italian, Portuguese, German, Polish, Russian, Armenian, Iranian, Indian, Vietnamese, Chinese, Japanese, Filipino, Mexican, Salvadorian, Argentine, Cuban, Puerto Rican, Hawaiian, Jewish, and Samoan.

Economy

Top employers
According to the city's 2021 Annual Comprehensive Financial Report, the top 10 employers in the city are:

Arts and culture
An illuminated cross, which stands on a hill above Lake San Marcos and is visible at night from many parts of the city, has been a community landmark for decades. Other landmarks include the Williams Barn (or "Red Barn"), a community center and reception hall built in 1952 to resemble a "big red barn." It is located in Walnut Grove Park in Twin Oaks, along with a collection of historic houses from around the city maintained by the San Marcos Historical Society.

Government
San Marcos uses a council-manager system of government with a separately elected mayor. The city council consists of the mayor and four other members, who are elected in Districts 1 & 2 in 2018 and Districts 3 & 4 in 2020, the Mayor is elected at large. As of December 2018, Mayor is Rebecca Jones, Mayor Pro Tem is Sharon Jenkins and other Councilmembers are Maria Nuñez for D1, Randy Walton for D2 and Ed Musgrove serves D4.
  
As of December 2018, the city manager is Jack Griffin.

At the state level, San Marcos is represented by Republican Assemblymember Marie Waldron in the 75th Assembly district, and Republican Senator Brian Jones in the 38th Senate District. The city is represented by Jim Desmond in the 5th district of the County Board of Supervisors.

Federal representation
With respect to the United States House of Representatives, San Marcos is in California's 50th congressional district, currently represented by Darrell Issa (R).

Education

San Marcos Unified School District

The San Marcos Unified School District is one of the largest school districts in San Diego County and includes 20 schools with diverse educational programs for kindergarten through adult education students. SMUSD has 11 elementary schools, 3 middle schools (San Elijo Hills, Woodland Park and San Marcos middle schools), 2 K-8 school (Double Peak, La Mirada Academy K-8), 2 comprehensive high schools (San Marcos High School and Mission Hills High School), 1 charter high school, 1 independent study high school, 1 continuation school, and 1 adult school. SMUSD serves more than 21,000 students in San Marcos, as well as sections of Vista, Escondido, Carlsbad and Encinitas, and some unincorporated areas of the County such as: Buena, Twin Oaks Valley, Deer Springs, Lake San Marcos, Harmony Grove, and Elfin Forrest. San Marcos Adult School was established in 1993 by the San Marcos Unified School District. San Marcos Adult School is a provider of adult education services in the City of San Marcos and its surrounding communities. The adult school campus is located on the grounds of Twin Oaks high school which is nestled in beautiful and historic Twin Oaks Valley. San Marcos Adult School offers adult education courses for adults in the areas of: high school diploma, GED, HISET, adult basic education, and English as a Second Language. San Marcos Adult School works collaboratively with Palomar College and other local adult schools to connect students with post-secondary education and training. San Marcos Adult School is a member of the Education to Career Network of North San Diego County. ETCN is one of 71 Consortiums in the State of California and is funded by the California Adult Education Program.

High Tech High, Middle and Elementary, North County
High Tech High, Middle and Elementary are all charter schools located in San Marcos. High Tech High, which started with a single school in 2000, uses small-school settings, where students learn through projects, internships and interaction with professionals. It is located across the street from San Marcos High School on San Marcos Boulevard.

Palomar College

The main  campus of Palomar College is located in northern San Marcos. It is a public two-year community college and is a member of the California Community Colleges system. It enrolls approximately 30,000 full-time and part-time students. Palomar offers more than 250 associate degree and certificate programs, and residents of California are charged $46 per unit.

A giant letter P (for "Palomar") on the hillside above the campus is a ubiquitous landmark for San Marcos, visible miles away.

California State University

Cal State San Marcos is a campus in the California State University system. It was founded in 1989 and built on a  hillside in southeastern San Marcos. It enrolls about 14,000 students and offers 44 undergraduate programs, 10 graduate programs and 1 Doctorate in Education in three colleges and one nursing school.

Infrastructure

Transportation

Roads and highways
State Route 78 provides freeway access to San Marcos, with six interchanges serving the city. Several roads in San Marcos are county routes that connect the city with other nearby cities including Vista, Carlsbad and Escondido, such as Rancho Santa Fe Road (CR S10), San Marcos Boulevard and Twin Oaks Valley Road (CR S12), and Mission Road (CR S14).

Public transportation
SPRINTER light rail service, which is operated by the North County Transit District (NCTD), is available in the city of San Marcos with stops located at Palomar College, the San Marcos Civic Center, and Cal State San Marcos. BREEZE buses, which are also operated by the North County Transit District, serve the city using lines 304, 305, 347, 353, and 445.

Notable people

 Terrell Burgess, professional football player, known for playing for Los Angeles Rams.
 Greg Evans, cartoonist and creator of Luann.
 Liliana Mumy, actress.
Fred Warner, professional football player.

See also

 List of cities and towns in California

References

External links

 San Marcos official website
 San Marcos Chamber of Commerce

 
1963 establishments in California
Cities in San Diego County, California
Incorporated cities and towns in California
North County (San Diego County)
Populated places established in 1963
San Diego metropolitan area